Branko Mikulić (10 June 1928 – 12 April 1994) was a Yugoslavian statesman. Mikulić was one of the leading communist politicians in Bosnia and Herzegovina during the communist rule in the former Yugoslavia.

Biography
Branko Mikulić was born to a Herzegovinian Croat family in 1928 in the vicinity of Gornji Vakuf, Kingdom of Serbs, Croats and Slovenes. His father was a prosperous farmer and a leading local member of the Croatian Peasant Party, who during World War II became a deputy on the State Anti-Fascist Council of People's Liberation of Bosnia and Herzegovina (ZAVNOBiH). Mikulić finished gymnasium in Bugojno and joined the Yugoslav Partisans in 1943. After the war he attended the University of Zagreb's Faculty of Economy.

Political activity

As a young and ambitious party leader, after studying in Zagreb he returned to his birthplace to become a full-time politician. He became a deputy for Bugojno, a deputy for the West Bosnian district, and in 1965 secretary of the Bosnian Communist party's central committee - before being elected its president a year later.

Mikulić and his team proceeded to build a system of social and national equality on the ZAVNOBiH model, by way of full emancipation of the Bosniak nation and reintegration of the Bosnian Croats into the political system. Meanwhile, western Herzegovina enjoyed  economic regeneration during the Mikulić's rule.

While working within the communist system, politicians that included Branko Mikulić but also Džemal Bijedić and Hamdija Pozderac reinforced and protected the sovereignty of Bosnia and Herzegovina and were considered as the backbone of the political system of Bosnia and Herzegovina during much of the 1970s and '80s.  Their efforts proved key during the turbulent period following Tito's death in 1980, and are today considered some of the early steps towards Bosnian independence.

President of the Federal Executive Council

Branko Mikulić was nominated by the Yugoslav presidency as successor to Milka Planinc in January 1986. In Ljubljana, Slovenian sociologist Tomaž Mastnak criticized Mikulić's nomination over the radio. The government subsequently laid charges against Mastnak. On 15 May 1986 Mikulić was appointed President of the Federal Executive Council of Yugoslavia.

In March 1987, Mikulić was publicly rebuked for his economic policy by striking workers who refused to serve him while in Kranjska Gora for a ski-jump competition. After the outbreak of 70 strikes nationally in a two-week period (with strikes being illegal in Yugoslavia), Mikulić threatened to mobilize the army to restore order in May 1987. Mikulić's government devalued the dinar by 25% on 17 November 1987. Mikulić reached a Standby Agreement with the International Monetary Fund in 1988. SR Croatia and SR Slovenia attempted to launch a no-confidence motion against Mikulić in May 1988, but this proved unsuccessful. 
In June 1988, several thousand people protested in front of the Federal Assembly calling for Mikulić's resignation. After a no-confidence vote in the Federal Assembly, Mikulić resigned his post on 30 December 1988 and returned to Sarajevo. With this, Mikulić's government became the first and only to resign in the history of communist Yugoslavia. Mikulić left office with Yugoslavia in 21 billion USD of debt to Western countries. He was replaced by Ante Marković on 16 March 1989.He received the last rites shortly before his death. Mikulić died quietly in April 1994 during the Siege of Sarajevo. He was buried in the Catholic cemetery Sv. Josip in Sarajevo.

References

Notes

Columns

External links

 Branko Mikulic - socialist emperor manqué
 Nesuđeni socijalistički car

1928 births
1994 deaths
People from Gornji Vakuf
Yugoslav Partisans members
Croats of Bosnia and Herzegovina
Yugoslav communists
Presidents of the Federal Executive Council of Yugoslavia
League of Communists of Bosnia and Herzegovina politicians
1984 Winter Olympics
Presidents of the Organising Committees for the Olympic Games
Recipients of the Olympic Order
Bosnia and Herzegovina people of World War II
Central Committee of the League of Communists of Yugoslavia members
Presidency of the Socialist Federal Republic of Yugoslavia members
Chairmen of the Presidency of Bosnia and Herzegovina
Deaths from lung cancer